Quaker City, Ohio, is a village in the US.

Quaker City may also refer to:

 Quaker City, Pennsylvania, US
 Quaker City (sound system), a UK sound system based in Birmingham
 The Quaker City, or The Monks of Monk Hall, a novel by George Lippard
 USS Quaker City (1854), steamship featured in Mark Twain's novel The Innocents Aboard
 The Quaker City, a nickname for Philadelphia, Pennsylvania
 Quaker City, a train operated by Amtrak as part of the Clocker service